Boris Gorenc (born 3 December 1973) is a former Slovenian professional basketball player, and basketball agent.

Professional career

Gorenc started playing basketball in KK Domžale, before in 1990 he joined KK Olimpija. He had been member Olimpija until 1996, and help team winning five times national championship and Saporta Cup. He moved to France in summer 1996, signed with Strasbourg IG. In 1997 he was invited to train with Chicago Bulls for two months and already signed with them, before he injured knees. He returned to France, signed with Pau-Orthez. However, in January he was released and signed with Pepsi Rimini, where he also played season 1998–1999. In January 2000 he signed with Bipop-Carire R.Emilia. Before season 2000–2001 he signed with Lineltex Imola, but in October he signed with Montepaschi Siena. He stayed in Tuscany until 2002, when he signed with Metis Varese. Season 2003-04 he played Euroleague with Olympiacos. Gorenc that last time played for Italian team, Snaidero Cucine. In January he left Italy to re-join Olympiacos. From 2005 to 2007 he played in Russia for BC Khimki. In October 2007 he signed with Olimpija. After many injuries they reached mutual consent in March 2008. He officially announced his retirement in September 2008.

National team career
Gorenc was a regular member of the senior Slovenian national basketball team, between 1992 and 2003. He competed in five EuroBaskets (1993, 1995, 1997, 2001, and 2003).

Honors and awards

Olimpija 
5× Slovenian League Champion: (1992, 1993, 1994, 1995, 1996)
4× Slovenian Cup Winner: (1992, 1993, 1994, 1995)
 FIBA European Cup Champion: (1994)

Siena 
 FIBA Saporta Cup Champion: (2002)

Individual 
 1994 European Championship for Men 'Under22 and Under' MVP
4× Slovenian League All-Star: (1993, 1994, 1995, 1996)
 Slovenian League All-Star MVP: (1994)
2× Slovenian League All-Star Slam Dunk Winner: (1993, 1996)
 Italian League Top Scorer: (2003)

Career statistics

EuroLeague

|-
| style="text-align:left;"| 2003–04
| style="text-align:left;"| Olympiacos
| 20 || 13 || 22.3 || .500 || .281 || .695 || 2.4 || 1.2 || .7 || .1 || 8.5 || 8.3
|-
| style="text-align:left;"| 2004–05
| style="text-align:left;"| Olympiacos
| 6 || 6 || 26.0 || .489 || .471 || .526 || 3.7 || 3.7 || 1.0 || .2 || 10.3 || 12.8
|-
| style="text-align:left;"| 2007–08
| style="text-align:left;"| Union Olimpija 
| 4 || 4 || 24.9 || .500 || .000 || .533 || 2.5 || 2.0 || .0 || .0 || 9.0 || 7.3
|- class="sortbottom"
| style="text-align:left;"| Career
| style="text-align:left;"|
| 30 || 23 || 24.4 || .497 || .304 || .634 || 2.7 || 1.8 || .6 || .1 || 8.9 || 9.5

External links

 Boris Gorenc at Euroleague.net
 Boris Gorenc at Eurobasket.com
 Boris Gorenc at FIBA.com

1973 births
Living people
ABA League players
Andrea Costa Imola players
Basket Rimini Crabs players
BC Khimki players
Élan Béarnais players
KK Olimpija players
Lega Basket Serie A players
Mens Sana Basket players
Olympiacos B.C. players
Pallacanestro Reggiana players
Pallacanestro Varese players
Pallalcesto Amatori Udine players
Shooting guards
SIG Basket players
Slovenian expatriate basketball people in France
Slovenian expatriate basketball people in Italy
Slovenian men's basketball players
Small forwards
Basketball players from Ljubljana